The 1995–96 Roller Hockey Champions Cup was the 31st edition of the Roller Hockey Champions Cup organized by CERH.

Igualada won its fourth consecutive title.

Teams
The champions of the main European leagues played this competition, consisting in a double-legged knockout tournament.

As Igualada, champion of the Spanish League, is the title holder, runners-up Barcelona achieved the place representing the Spanish league.

Bracket

Source:

References

External links
 CERH website

1995 in roller hockey
1996 in roller hockey
Rink Hockey Euroleague